Kamennoye is a rural locality (a village) in Vakhnevskoye Rural Settlement, Nikolsky District, Vologda Oblast, Russia. The population was 99 as of 2002.

Geography 
The distance to Nikolsk is 43 km, to Vakhnevo is 5 km. Kotelnoye is the nearest rural locality.

References 

Rural localities in Nikolsky District, Vologda Oblast